This is a list of songs that topped the Belgian Walloon (francophone) Ultratop 40 in 2008.

Best-selling singles 
This is the ten best-selling/performing singles in 2008.

See also
2008 in music

References

External links
 Ultratop 40

Ultratop 40
Belgium Ultratop 40
2008